Westcliff is a wealthy suburb of Johannesburg, South Africa. It has many old mansions, and views over the Northern Suburbs. It is the site of the Westcliff Hotel also known as the Four Seasons Hotel. With a total wealth of $235 billion, Johannesburg is Africa’s wealthiest city, and most of the wealth in Johannesburg is concentrated in just four suburbs: Sandhurst, Houghton, Hyde Park and Westcliff.

References

External links 
http://www.westcliff.co.za Westcliff Hotel

Johannesburg Region B